The 2020 Arkansas Democratic presidential primary took place on March 3, 2020, as one of 15 contests scheduled on Super Tuesday in the Democratic Party primaries for the 2020 presidential election, following the South Carolina primary the weekend before. The Arkansas primary was an open primary, with the state awarding 36 delegates towards the 2020 Democratic National Convention, of which 31 were pledged delegates allocated on the basis of the results of the primary.

Former vice president Joe Biden won every county but Washington County and received 41% of the vote and 17 delegates, far ahead of senator Bernie Sanders' 22% and former mayor Michael Bloomberg's 17%, who won 9 and 5 delegates each. Senator Elizabeth Warren did not pass the 15% threshold.

Procedure
Arkansas was one of 14 states and one territory holding primaries on March 3, 2020, also known as "Super Tuesday", having joined other states on the date after the signing of a bill calling for simultaneous state, local, and presidential primaries on the first Tuesday in March in presidential election years by governor Asa Hutchinson on March 21, 2019.

In the open primary, candidates had to meet a threshold of 15 percent at the congressional district or statewide level in order to be considered viable. The 31 pledged delegates to the 2020 Democratic National Convention were allocated proportionally on the basis of the results of the primary. Of these, between 4 and 6 were allocated to each of the state's 4 congressional districts and another 4 were allocated to party leaders and elected officials (PLEO delegates), in addition to 7 at-large delegates. The Super Tuesday primary as part of Stage I on the primary timetable received no bonus delegates, in order to disperse the primaries between more different date clusters and keep too many states from hoarding on the first shared date or on a March date in general.

The congressional district caucus and state conventions were all held virtually on May 30, 2020 as a "first-in-the-nation virtual convention" in Little Rock, to vote on all pledged degates from district-level and statewide level. The delegation also included 5 unpledged PLEO delegates: 5 members of the Democratic National Committee.

Candidates
The following people have filed for the presidential primary.

Running 

Joe Biden
Michael Bloomberg
Mosie Boyd
Tulsi Gabbard
Bernie Sanders
Elizabeth Warren

Withdrawn

Michael Bennet
Cory Booker
Steve Bullock
Pete Buttigieg
Julian Castro
John Delaney
Kamala Harris
Amy Klobuchar
Joe Sestak
Tom Steyer
Marianne Williamson
Andrew Yang

Polling

Results

Results by county

Notes

See also
 2020 Arkansas Republican presidential primary

References

External links
The Green Papers delegate allocation summary
Arkansas Democratic Party draft delegate selection plan

Arkansas Democratic
Democratic primary
2020